WJDY (1470 AM) is a radio station broadcasting a news/talk format. It is licensed to Salisbury, Maryland, United States, and owned by iHeartMedia, Inc.  WJDY is identified on-air as Newsradio 1470, with Fox News Radio updates at the top and bottom of each hour.

The station used to broadcast Bloomberg Radio, a sports format under the Fox Sports Radio network, a news/talk format using the CNN Headline News service and before that, it was adult standards.

References

External links

JDY
IHeartMedia radio stations
Radio stations established in 1958
1958 establishments in Maryland
News and talk radio stations in the United States